Enlil-bāni, ca. 1798 BC – 1775 BC (short chronology) or 1860 – 1837 BC (middle chronology), was the 10th king of the 1st Dynasty of Isin and reigned 24 years according to the Ur-Isin kinglist. He is best known for the legendary and perhaps apocryphal manner of his ascendancy.

Biography 
A certain Ikūn-pî-Ištar is recorded as having ruled for 6 months or a year, between the reigns of Erra-imittī and Enlil-bāni according to two variant copies of a chronicle. Another chronicle which might have shed further light on his origins is too broken to translate. A lengthy inscription proclaims:

Hegemony over Nippur was fleeting, with control of the city passing back and forth between Isin and Larsa several times. Uruk, too, seceded during his reign and, as his power crumbled, he may have had the Chronicle of Early Kings redacted to provide a more legendary tale of his accession than the rather mundane act of usurpation that it may well have been. It relates that Erra-Imittī selected his gardener, Enlil-bâni, enthroned him, and placed the royal tiara on his head. Erra-Imittī then died while eating hot porridge, and Enlil-bâni by virtue of his refusal to quit the throne, became king.

The colophon of a medical text, “when a man's brain contains fire,” from the Library of Ashurbanipal reads: “Proven and tested salves and poultices, fit for use, according to the old sages from before the flood from Šuruppak, which Enlil-muballiṭ, sage (apkallu) of Nippur, left (to posterity) in the second year of Enlil-bāni.”
 
Enlil-bāni found it necessary to "build anew the wall of Isin which had become dilapidated," which he recorded on commemorative cones. He named the wall Enlil-bāni-išdam-kīn, “Enlil-bāni is firm as to foundation.” In practice, the walls of major cities were probably under continuous repair. He was a prodigious builder, responsible for the construction of the é-ur-gi7-ra, “the dog house,” temple of Ninisina, a palace, also the é-ní-dúb-bu, “house of relaxation,” for the goddess Nintinugga, “lady who revives the dead,” the é-dim-gal-an-na, “house - great mast of heaven,” for the tutelary deity of Šuruppak, the goddess Sud, and finally, the é-ki-ág-gá-ni for Ninibgal, the “lady with patient mercy who loves ex-votos, who heeds prayers and entreaties, his shining mother.” Two large copper statues were taken to Nippur for dedication to Ningal, which Iddin-Dagān had fashioned 117 years earlier but had been unable to deliver, “on account of this, the goddess Ninlil had the god Enlil lengthen the life span of Enlil-Bāni.”

There are perhaps two hymns addressed to this monarch.

Inscriptions

Notes

External links 
Enlil-bāni year-names at CDLI.
A praise poem of Enlil-bāni at ETCSL.

References 

 

Amorite kings
19th-century BC Sumerian kings
18th-century BC Sumerian kings
Dynasty of Isin
19th-century BC people
18th-century BC people